National Commission on Agriculture was an Indian Government body that was created to find ways to increase agricultural productivity in India.

The Commission was founded in August 1970 under the Ministry of Agriculture. It released its final report in fifteen parts in 1976 under N. R. Mirdha. It recommended water management, development of a number of farm related sectors including subsidiary sectors and promoted skill development and research.

References 

Indian commissions and inquiries
Ministry of Agriculture & Farmers' Welfare
Agricultural organisations based in India
1970 establishments in India
1976 disestablishments in India